Fort Lauderdale–Hollywood International Airport  is a major public airport in Broward County, Florida, United States. It is one of three airports serving the Miami metropolitan area.

With over 700 daily flights to 135 domestic and international destinations, FLL has become an intercontinental gateway since the late 1990s, although Miami International Airport still handles most long-haul flights. FLL serves as a primary airport for the Fort Lauderdale, Pompano Beach, and Boca Raton areas, and a secondary airport for parts of Miami and areas north of Boca Raton for flights that are not served by Palm Beach International Airport, such as Delray Beach, Jupiter, Boynton Beach, and West Palm Beach. The airport is a base for Allegiant Air, JetBlue and Spirit Airlines, the latter of which has their corporate headquarters nearby in the suburb of Miramar, Florida. In addition, FLL is the primary South Florida airport for Southwest Airlines (although Southwest also serves both Miami and Palm Beach as well) with the majority of Southwest flights currently serving Fort Lauderdale. FLL is classified by the US Federal Aviation Administration as a "major hub" facility serving commercial air traffic.

History

1926-59
World War 1 aviator Merle Fogg purchased an abandoned 9-hole golf course that was destroyed in the 1926 Miami hurricane for $1,200 in 1928. On May 1, 1929, the airport officially opened as Merle Fogg Field, with two criss-cross unpaved runways. At the start of World War II, it was commissioned by the United States Navy and renamed Naval Air Station Fort Lauderdale. The runways were paved, and a control tower was built. The base was initially used for refitting civil airliners for military service before they were ferried across the Atlantic to Europe and North Africa. NAS Fort Lauderdale later became a main training base for Naval Aviators and enlisted naval air crewmen flying the Grumman TBF and TBM Avenger for the U.S. Navy and U.S. Marine Corps aboard aircraft carriers and from expeditionary airfields ashore. NAS Fort Lauderdale was the home base for Flight 19, the five TBM Avengers that disappeared in December 1945, leading in part to the notoriety of the Bermuda Triangle.

NAS Fort Lauderdale closed on October 1, 1946, and was transferred to county control, becoming Broward County International Airport.

Commercial flights to Nassau began on June 2, 1953, and domestic flights began in 1958–1959: Northeast Airlines and National Airlines DC-6Bs flew nonstop to Idlewild, and Northeast flew nonstop to Washington National. In 1959 the airport opened its first permanent terminal building and assumed its current name.

1960-99
In 1966, the airport averaged 48 airline operations a day; in 1972, it averaged 173 a day.

The Feb 1966 Official Airline Guide shows three nonstop departures to New York–Kennedy and no other nonstop flights beyond Tampa and Orlando. Five years later. FLL had added nonstop flights to Atlanta, Baltimore, Boston, Buffalo, Chicago, Cleveland, Detroit, Minneapolis, New York–La Guardia, Newark, Philadelphia, and Pittsburgh. (Northeast's nonstop to Los Angeles had already been dropped.)

By 1974, the airport was served by Braniff International Airways, Delta Air Lines, Eastern Air Lines, National Airlines, Northwest Orient Airlines, Shawnee Airlines and United Airlines. Delta and Eastern were the dominant carriers, with 12 and 14 routes from FLL respectively. By 1979, following deregulation, Air Florida, Bahamasair, Florida Airlines, Mackey International Airlines, Republic Airlines, Trans World Airlines and Western Airlines also served the airport.

Low-cost airline traffic grew in the 1990s, with Southwest opening its base in 1996, Spirit in 1999, and JetBlue in 2000. Spirit Airlines made FLL a hub in 2002. In 2003, JetBlue made FLL a focus city. US Airways also planned a hub at Fort Lauderdale in the mid-2000s as part of its reorganization strategy before its merger with America West. Eventually, low-cost competition forced several major legacy airlines to cut back service to FLL, with United pulling out of the airport entirely in 2008 and American Airlines moving its New York and Los Angeles services to West Palm Beach in 2013.

2000-14
In January 2000, the Fort Lauderdale airport acquired a direct flight from Africa. South African Airways (SAA) introduced a Boeing 747 service from Cape Town to Atlanta via the Florida city; the flight from Atlanta to South Africa operated nonstop. The aircraft needed to refuel in Fort Lauderdale before continuing on to Atlanta. SAA also selected the city as a stopover to take advantage of Delta Air Lines' network from the airport; SAA had just started code-sharing with Delta. Changes to security regulations following the September 11 attacks forced SAA to eliminate the halt in Fort Lauderdale.

During the 2005 hurricane season FLL was affected by Hurricane Katrina and Hurricane Wilma. Katrina struck land in late August as a Category 1 and made landfall on Keating Beach just two miles from the airport (near the border of Broward and Miami–Dade counties) with  winds but caused only minor damage; however, the airport was closed for about a 48-hour period. However, when Hurricane Wilma made landfall in October roof damage was reported along with broken windows, damaged jetways, and destroyed canopies. The airport was closed for a period of five days. Hurricane Wilma was a Category 2 when its center passed to the west of FLL.

In February 2007, the airport started fees to all users, including private aircraft. FLL is one of the few airports to administer fees to private pilots. A minimum charge of $10 is assessed on landing private aircraft.

2015-present
On October 11, 2016, Emirates announced that they would operate a flight from Dubai to Ft. Lauderdale daily using a Boeing 777-200LR. The airline decided on Fort Lauderdale instead of Miami, which has longer runways and better facilities for widebody aircraft and long-haul flights; FLL was chosen because of Emirates's codeshare agreement with JetBlue. The service ended in 2020 due to the COVID-19 pandemic.

On January 6, 2017, a lone gunman opened fire inside Terminal 2 with a semi-automatic handgun, killing five people. The shooter was arrested by a BSO deputy within 85 seconds of when he began shooting. He was sentenced to five consecutive life sentences plus 120 years in prison.

In 2018, NORAD announced that it would be stationing fighter jets at the airport during President Donald Trump's trips to Mar-a-Lago.

As of 2018, the airport had been going through an extensive renovation and expansion project worth approximately $3 billion that has added gates, new parking, stores, and shops. The master plan calls for the construction of an Intermodal center, a people mover, a hotel, an increase in the number of gates from 62 to 95, and widening of the terminal access road.

On February 15, 2023, El Al announced that they would commence seasonal operations with a flight from Tel Aviv to Ft. Lauderdale in September 2023, transitioning to year-round operations in Spring of 2024. The service will be operated onboard their 787 Dreamliner, and marks the first time the airport saw a direct flight to Israel.

Facilities

 10L/28R: 9,000 x 150 ft (2,743 x 46 m): asphalt
 10R/28L: 8,000 x 150 ft (2,438 x 46 m): concrete (enlarged September 18, 2014)
In December 2021, there were 111 aircraft based at this airport: 23 single-engine, 13 multi-engine, 74 jet, and 1 helicopter.

Silver Airways has its headquarters in Suite 201 of the 1100 Lee Wagener Blvd building. When Chalk's International Airlines existed, its headquarters was on the grounds of the airport in an unincorporated area.

Terminals
Fort Lauderdale–Hollywood International Airport has four terminals with 66 gates. Terminal 1, commonly referred to as "The New Terminal," opened in stages between 2001 and 2003 and was designed by Hellmuth, Obata and Kassabaum and Cartaya Associates. The other three terminals were constructed in 1986 and designed by Reynolds, Smith & Hills as part of a $263 million construction project. Terminal 4, commonly referred to as the International Terminal, was inaugurated by a Concorde visit in 1983. Since 2005, T4 has been undergoing renovations and a major expansion designed by PGAL/Zyscovich joint venture. The airport announced that Terminal 1, commonly known as "The New Terminal", underwent a $300 million makeover. Construction began in late 2015 and was completed in June 2017.

Terminal 1, known as the Yellow Terminal, contains Concourses A, B & C and 23 gates. Concourse A mainly serves international travelers. United Airlines operates a United Club in Concourse C, which originally opened with the new Terminal in May 2001 as a Continental Airlines Presidents Club before United merged with Continental Airlines. This terminal is also the most frequently used of the four by Southwest Airlines; nearly all Southwest flights operate out of Concourse B.

Terminal 2, known as the Red Terminal, contains Concourse D and 9 gates. Air Canada and Delta Air Lines operate at Terminal 2. Delta Air Lines operates a Sky Club here. This terminal is currently undergoing a $100 million modernization, including the expansion of the check-in area, renovations to security screening facilities, new ceilings, flooring, and the inclusion of more concessions, along with the modernization of the Sky Club.

Terminal 3, known as the Purple Terminal, contains Concourses E & F with 20 gates, functioning as the JetBlue operating base. This terminal includes a small food court serving passengers dishes from Pei Wei Asian Diner, Steak 'n Shake, and Einstein Bros. Bagels. It is also connected to Terminal 4 via a newly built walkway.

Terminal 4, known as the Green Terminal, contains Concourse G with 14 gates, and functions as the Spirit operating base. Concourse H closed in December 2017 and has since been demolished. The former Concourse H was reconfigured and redesigned by the architectural firms of PGAL/Zyscovich joint venture. The new three-story facility, which was renamed Concourse G, has 14 new gates, 11 of which are international/domestic capable, and one arrival area for bussing operations. New concessions, seatings, and approximately 50,000 sq. ft. of administrative offices for the Aviation Department are being designed on the upper levels of the facility.  An expanded U.S. Customs and Border Protection facility will also be included in the new Eastern Expansion construction.

Ground transportation

Fort Lauderdale–Hollywood International Airport is near the Fort Lauderdale/Hollywood International Airport at Dania Beach train station, served by Amtrak intercity trains and Tri-Rail commuter trains. The latter provides a shuttle bus service from the station to three locations at the airport, all on the lower level: the west end of terminal 1, between terminals 2 and 3, and between terminals 3 and 4. The shuttles operate seven days a week and are free for Tri-Rail customers.

The terminals are accessible by U.S. Route 1. Other major roads that border the airport include Florida State Road 818, Interstate 95, and Interstate 595. U.S. Route 1 includes an underpass under Runway 10R/28L.

Ride-sharing companies can also be used to and from the airport in designated pickup and drop-off places found between Terminals 1 and 2 and Terminals 3 and 4.

The airport also offers airport parking and operates a consolidated rental car facility which can be accessed from Terminal 1 by a short walk and from the other terminals by a free shuttle bus service.

FLL is served by Broward County Transit bus Route 1 which offers connecting service through the Broward Central Terminal in downtown Fort Lauderdale, and also serves to Aventura Mall in Aventura, Florida, in Miami-Dade County.

Art
Internationally known artist and sculptor Duane Hanson created an installation for his work Vendor with Walkman at the Departure Level of Terminal 3 at the airport. Hanson, who retired and died in nearby Boca Raton, created a seated middle-aged man wearing a red T-shirt, blue pants, and baseball cap, and listening to a walkman during a break. The installation accessories give additional clues to the narrative of the artwork: toy airplane, various signs, and announcements for the shop, janitorial supplies. The artwork has since been moved to Terminal 1 Arrival Level.

Airlines and destinations

Passenger

Cargo

Statistics

Top destinations

Annual traffic

Airline market share

Accidents and incidents

On May 18, 1972, an Eastern Air Lines McDonnell Douglas DC-9-31 had its landing gear collapse and tail section separate during landing. The aircraft then caught fire but all passengers and crew were able to safely evacuate.
On May 26, 1979, an Inter Island Shipping Inc. Howard 350 crashed when one engine lost power shortly after takeoff during a forced landing, impacting trees near FLL. Both occupants died. Contaminated fluid was found in the carburetor of the engine.
On July 7, 1983, Air Florida Flight 8 with 47 people on board was flying from Fort Lauderdale International Airport to Tampa International Airport. One of the passengers handed a note to a flight attendant, saying that he had a bomb, and telling them to fly the plane to Havana, Cuba. He opened a small athletic bag, inside of which an apparent explosive device. The airplane was diverted to Havana-José Martí International Airport, and the hijacker was taken into custody by Cuban authorities.
On November 19, 2013, an Air Evac International Learjet 35 crashed shortly after take-off from the airport, on its way to Cozumel, Mexico, after calling mayday and during an attempt to return to the airport, possibly due to engine failure, leaving four people dead.
On October 29, 2015, Dynamic Airways Flight 405, a Boeing 767-246ER (N251MY) was taxiing to a runway to take off for a flight to Caracas, Venezuela. when its left engine caught fire due to a fuel leak. The crew immediately stopped the airplane and fire crews arrived on the scene. All 101 passengers and crew evacuated the aircraft, and 17 passengers were transported to a hospital. All runways were shut down and air operations ceased at the airport for three hours.
On October 28, 2016, FedEx Express Flight 910, a McDonnell Douglas MD-10-10F suffered a landing gear collapse upon landing. The aircraft subsequently caught fire, which destroyed the left wing and engine. The two crew members on board both survived.

References

External links

 Fort Lauderdale–Hollywood International Airport (official site)
 Off-site parking at FLL
  brochure from CFASPP
 Naval Air Station Fort Lauderdale Museum (History of Ft. Lauderdale – Hollywood Airport)
 
 

 
Airports in Broward County, Florida
Airports in Florida
Economy of Fort Lauderdale, Florida
Transportation in Fort Lauderdale, Florida
Airports established in 1929
1929 establishments in Florida